The Diocese of Apatzingan is a Latin Church ecclesiastical territory or diocese of the Catholic Church in Mexico. It is a suffragan in the ecclesiastical province of the metropolitan Archdiocese of Morelia. Its cathedra is found within the Immaculate Conception Cathedral, in the episcopal see of Apatzingan, Michoacán.

History
The Diocese of Apatzingan was erected on 30 April 1962. Along with the Diocese of Ciudad Altamirano, it lost territory in 1985 to form the Diocese of Ciudad Lázaro Cárdenas.

Ordinaries
Victorino Alvarez Tena (1962 -1974), appointed Bishop of Celaya, Guanajuato
José Fernández Arteaga (1974 -1980), appointed Bishop of Colima
Miguel Patiño Velázquez, M.S.F. (1981 -2014)
Cristóbal Ascencio García (2014 - )

External links and references

Apatzingan
Apatzingan, Roman Catholic Diocese of
Apatzingan
Apatzingan
1962 establishments in Mexico